Denis Murphy (born 1990) is an Irish hurler who plays as a full-forward for the Carlow senior team. 

Born in Borris, County Carlow, Murphy first played competitive hurling whilst at school in Borris Vocational School. He made his first impression on the inter-county scene as a dual player at minor level before later joining the under-21 hurling team. He made his senior debut during the 2010 championship. Murphy only played for one championship season and enjoyed little success.

At club level Murphy is a one-time Leinster medallist with Mount Leinster Rangers. He also won five championship medals.

Career statistics

Club

Honours

Team

Mount Leinster Rangers
Leinster Senior Club Hurling Championship (1): 2013
Carlow Senior Hurling Championship (5): 2007, 2009, 2011, 2012, 2013
All-Ireland Intermediate Club Hurling Championship (1): 2012
Leinster Intermediate Club Hurling Championship (1): 2011

References

1985 births
Living people
Mount Leinster Rangers hurlers
Carlow inter-county hurlers